Alexander and the Terrible, Horrible, No Good, Very Bad Day is a 1972 ALA Notable Children's Book written by Judith Viorst and illustrated by Ray Cruz. It has also won a George G. Stone Center Recognition of Merit, a Georgia Children's Book Award, and is a Reading Rainbow book. Viorst followed this book up with three sequels, Alexander, Who Used to be Rich Last Sunday, Alexander, Who's Not (Do You Hear Me? I Mean It!) Going to Move, and Alexander, Who's Trying His Best to Be the Best Boy Ever.

Plot
Alexander narrates the story of having a terrible, horrible, no good very bad day. From the moment Alexander woke up, he noticed the bubble gum that was in his mouth when he fell asleep had now gotten stuck in his hair. Then, when he got out of bed, he tripped on his skateboard. In the bathroom, he accidentally dropped his favorite sweater into the sink while the water was on. His brothers, Anthony and Nick, find prizes in their breakfast cereal boxes, whereas Alexander's cereal box contains only flakes of food. 

In the carpool on the way to school, Alexander sits between two other kids in back and his complaints are ignored. At school, Alexander's teacher discourages his picture of the "invisible castle", which is really just a blank sheet of paper. She later criticizes him for singing too loudly, and scolds him for skipping the number 16 at counting time. At recess, Alexander's best friend Paul tells him that he is now only his third-best friend. Then, Alexander finds that his mother neglected to include a sweet treat with his lunch. 

After school, Alexander's mother takes him and his brothers to the dentist who finds a cavity in Alexander's mouth. Alexander then recalls other bad things on the way back to the car. First the elevator door closed on his foot and outside Anthony pushed Alexander into a mud puddle and Nick called him a "cry baby". Finally, when Alexander started hitting his brother for calling him names, his mother scolded him for getting dirty and starting a fight.

At the shoe store, Alexander wants blue sneakers with red stripes, but they are sold out. His mother buys him plain white shoes, which are the only ones available in his size, but he refuses to wear them. When his family comes to pick up his father at the office, Alexander plays with the copying machine, knocks over books, and tries to use the telephone, resulting in the dad asking the family not to pick him up anymore.

That night, after having lima beans at dinner, Alexander is disgusted by a love scene on TV, his bathwater is too hot, soap gets in his eyes, his marble is lost in the drain, and he is forced to wear his "railroad-train" pajamas. Lastly, at bedtime, Nick has taken back a pillow he said Alexander could keep, Alexander's nightlight burns out, he bites his tongue, and the cat chooses to sleep with Anthony instead of him.

A running gag throughout the book consists of Alexander wishing to move to Australia because he thinks life is better there. His mother assures him that everybody has bad days, even in Australia. In the Australian and New Zealand versions of the book, he wants to move to Timbuktu instead.

TV adaptation

On September 15, 1990, the book was adapted into a thirty-minute animated musical television special that was produced by Klasky Csupo and aired on HBO in the United States. Along with some alterations to the designs of the supporting characters, along with the cat's name being Timothy, and additions to the plot, most notably Alexander searching for his lost yo-yo throughout, the special also included three original songs:

 "So much to do, so little time in the morning"
 "If I could be the only child"
 "I've had a terrible, horrible, no good, very bad day"

Cast
Daniel Tamberelli as Alexander (speaking voice)
Todd Defreitas as Alexander (singing voice)
Joey Rigol as Nick
Devon Michaels as Anthony
Linda Wallem as Mom
Steve Barton as Dad
Stephanie Maddin as Mrs. Dickens 
William Bogert as Dr. Fields
Skip Hinnant as Shoe Salesman
Ashley Carin as Girl #1
Erin Torpey as Girl #2
Buddy Smith as Paul
Daniel Riefsnyder as Phillip
Z. Wright as Albert

Other media
In 1998, Viorst and the Kennedy Center joined together to turn the book into a musical production. Charles Strouse wrote the music, Viorst wrote the script and lyrics, and the musical score was composed by Shelly Markham. The productions have been performed around the country. Other characters in it are Audrey, Becky, and many others.

A Disney live-action film adaptation with not much involvement from the book was released in 2014. In 2020, it was reported that another film version was being developed for Disney+.

Characters
Alexander and his two older brothers, Anthony and Nick, are based on Viorst's own three sons of the same names. But the film changed Nick to Emily, replacing the brother with a sister, and adds Trevor as well.

Posterity
The phrase "terrible, horrible, no good, very bad . . ." has become an Internet meme, often used by bloggers, and sometimes by mainstream media, to criticize, or characterize setbacks for, an individual or political movement.
The title is also used in the song "A-O-K" by Tai Verdes.

References

American picture books
1972 children's books
Children's books adapted into films
Atheneum Books books